Shikufitzky is a comic strip appearing in the weekly Jewish magazine Mishpacha.
Shikufitzky is also the books of short comics about their family

Israeli comic strips